Ricardo Mórtola Di Puglia (c. 1950 – 22 April 2014) was an Ecuadorian architect and businessman. He was known for constructing Estadio Monumental Isidro Romero Carbo in Barcelona. He won many awards during his twenty-year career. He was born in Guayaquil, Ecuador.

Mórtola died in Guayaquil, Ecuador from testicular cancer, aged 63.

References

1950 births
2014 deaths
Deaths from cancer in Ecuador
Deaths from testicular cancer
Ecuadorian architects
Ecuadorian businesspeople
People from Guayaquil